Janita Stenhouse, née Thompson, also known as Yogacharini Jnanasundari, (born 20 May 1947) is a British yoga instructor and author.

Childhood experiences of sahaja Samadhi in rural New Zealand led Janita in her teenage years to a study of Indian philosophy. At age 20 she started practising hatha yoga while studying Art & Design at Liverpool.

Stenhouse lived for three years in Varanasi, India where she studied Hindi and Indian classical music. Back in UK she studied hatha yoga with Lakshmi Waters, who encouraged her to study with Dr. Swami Gitananda Giri, and become a Yoga teacher.

Stenhouse has also studied with Sri Mahesh and senior students of BKS Iyengar and TKV Desikachar.  She also studied Yoga therapy with Dr. Robin Munro (Yoga Biomedical Trust), particularly Yoga for lower back pain. She studied for many years with Dr. Jonn Mumford, and has illustrated several of his articles.

She is the author of three books:
 Sun Yoga: the Book of sûrya namaskâr
Morning Yoga Evening Yoga 
The Polair Illustrated Yoga Dictionary 

Stenhouse is also the author of many articles on Yoga and two cartoon series (the Metamorphosis of âsana to samâdhi; the World According to Yogi Beher) which have been published in Yoga magazines in the UK, France and Australia.

Stenhouse is a mother and grandmother, and now lives in central France where she teaches locally, nationally and internationally. She has spent several periods at ICYER as a student, as well as in her present role of teacher and has been awarded the Yoga Chemmal Award in 2011.

References

British yoga teachers

1947 births
Living people